Lesedi Sheya Jacobs (born 1 October 1997 in Windhoek) is a Namibian female tennis player.

Jacobs has won 1 ITF singles title on the professional tour, and reached a career high singles ranking of 871 on 31 October 2016 and career high doubles ranking of 1065 on 26 September 2016.

Playing for Namibia at the Fed Cup, Jacobs has a win–loss record of 6–13.

On the junior circuit, she reached a career high ranking of world number 88 on 8 June 2015.

Jacobs is attending the University of Kentucky from 2015.

ITF finals: 2 (1–1)

Singles: 1 (1–0)

Doubles: 1 (0–1)

Fed Cup participation

Singles

Doubles

References

External links 
 
 
 

1997 births
Living people
Sportspeople from Windhoek
Namibian female tennis players
Tennis players at the 2014 Summer Youth Olympics
Kentucky Wildcats women's tennis players